Blackmiles is a townland in County Westmeath, Ireland.

Blackmiles is one of 11 townlands of the civil parish of Stonehall in the barony of Corkaree in the Province of Leinster.

The neighbouring townlands are: Knockbody to the north, Martinstown, County Westmeath to the south–east, Galmoylestown Lower to the south, Galmoylestown Upper to the south, Larkinstown to the south–west and Stonehall to the north–west.

In the 1911 census of Ireland there was 1 house and 4 inhabitants in the townland.

References

External links
Map of Blackmiles at openstreetmap.org
Blackmiles at the IreAtlas Townland Data Base
Blackmiles at Townlands.ie
 Blackmiles at The Placenames Database of Ireland

Townlands of County Westmeath